Johannes Josephus Aarts (18 August 1871, in The Hague – 19 October 1934, in Amsterdam) was a Dutch painter, illustrator, lithographer, engraver, etcher, writer, academic teacher and director, lecturer, sculptor and book-cover designer.

Life and work 
Jan Aarts received training in the Royal Academy of Art, The Hague. He was active there until 1911, and in Amsterdam from 1911 to 1934.
Initially, until around 1900, Aarts worked above all on engravings. Thereafter he began to also use other graphic methods. In his work, one found depictions of farmworkers, dyke workers and later also tramps, beggars and invalids. Between 1920 and 1930 he produced mostly visionary work with apocalyptic scenes.

He thereby contributed to the renewal of various graphic techniques in the Netherlands. He painted portraits, animals and landscapes, including cityscapes and dune-landscapes.

Gallery

References

Further reading 
 Heij, Jan Jaap.  "Aarts, Johannes Josephus." In Grove Art Online. Oxford Art Online, (accessed February 4, 2012; subscription required).

External links 

 Entry for Johannes Josephus Aarts on the Union List of Artist Names

1871 births
1934 deaths
20th-century Dutch painters
Dutch male painters
20th-century Dutch sculptors
Dutch engravers
Dutch printmakers
Dutch male sculptors
Artists from The Hague
20th-century Dutch male artists
20th-century engravers